Naval Advance Base Espiritu Santo or Naval Base Espiritu Santo, most often just called Espiritu Santo, was a major advance Naval base that the U.S. Navy Seabees built during World War II to support the Allied effort in the Pacific. The base was located on the island of Espiritu Santo in the New Hebrides, now Vanuatu, in the South Pacific. The base also supported the U.S. Army and Army Air Corps, U.S. Coast Guard, and US Marine Corps. It was the first large advance base built in the Pacific. By the end of the war it had become the second-largest base in the theater. To keep ships tactically available there was a demand for bases that could repair and resupply the fleet at advance locations, rather than return them to the United States.  Prior to December 7th, Pearl Harbor was the U.S. fleet's largest advance base in the Pacific. Espiritu 
became capable of all aspects necessary to support the Fleet's operations from fleet logistics in fuel, food, and ammunition, to transport embarkation for combat operations or returning to the continental United States. The ship repair facilities and drydocks were capable of attending to most damage and routine maintenance. Had it not existed, ships would have had to return to Pearl Harbor, Brisbane, or Sydney for major repairs and resupply. The base became a major R and R destination for the fleet.

History

At the start of the war Espiritu Santo was one of a string of roughly 80 islands under the rule of a joint British and French New Hebrides colony. The administration was the Anglo-French Condominium of the New Hebrides. U.S. troops first set up a base in May 1942 on the nearby island of Efate, as a defence against the expanding Imperial Japan. In July 1942 the 1st Construction Battalion (CB) sent a detail from the 3rd CB Construction detachment that was on Efate to Espiritu Santo to build a bomber strip to attack the Japanese on Guadalcanal. The 4th Marine Defense Battalion and the 24th Infantry Regiment both on Efate respectively sent an anti-aircraft battery and an Infantry Company to help the Seabees. Together, working around the clock, they built Turtle Bay Airfield in 20 days. In August the 7th CB arrived tasked with constructing a base. In 60 days they had built a second field and began work on two more. In October the 15th CB arrived. In February the 36th Naval Construction Battalion arrived as did the 40th CB.

Facilities
 Navy port - support base
 Navy Base Hospital No. 1 at Bellevue plantation, 1,500-beds in quonset huts (600 beds to start)
 Navy Base Hospital No. 2
 Navy Base Hospital No. 3, now Northern Provincial Hospital
 25th Evacuation Hospital 
 Naval harbors for anchoring
 Floating drydock repairs
 Luganville Seaplane Base served the PBY seaplanes at Havannah Harbor
 Pontoon wharf at Santo 
 Vanuatu Labor Corps
 Naval Air Station Tender
Crash boat base
 Aviation Overhaul shop
 Red Cross Service Club
 Officers Club
 Casual camp
 Motor pool
 Quartermaster Laundry
 17th Photo Detachment
 Army Air Force Transient Camp
 Army Air Force Fighter pilot camp
 Royal New Zealand Air Force Fighter pilot camp
 Firing ranges
 Torpedo assembly center
 Construction Battalion Maintenance Unit 
 Navy Fleet Ammunition Stores, large complex north of base for safety
 Marine Air Depot Squadron
 Army Air Force Bombers Camp
 Marine Camp
 Marine Air Warning Squadron 
 Oxygen Plant
 Navy Net Layer center
 US Navy Port Director's Office,  now Cruise Ship Terminal 
 Navy Pier No 1, now Cruise Ship Terminal 
 Navy Pier No 2, 3 and 4
 Aore Island - Navy Ammunition store, Navy mine assembly, Fuel Store, Fleet Recreational Center
 PT Boat base #1 and #2
 Sarakata River Bridge
 Boat repair dock
 Pallikula Bay Pontoon Wharf
 AA gun emplacements
 Naval Air Transport Service Facilities
 Tank farms for: Fuel oil, aviation fuel, diesel fuel, gasoline
 Headquarters at Malapoa Point
 Barracks 
 Navy Bank
 Fleet Post Office FPO# 140 SF Espiritu Santo, New Hebrides
 Mess halls
 Navy Communication Center
 Troop store
 Royal New Zealand Air Force seaplane base
 Military supply depot
 Espiritu Santo Military Cemetery opened in 1944
 Army 122nd  Station Hospital
 687th Quartermaster Bakery Company
 US Army Radar & Searchlight
 674th Signal Air Warning Company
 Coral mining pits
 Trash dump

Built at the bases were personnel housing, piers, roads, shops, power plants, water plants and large storage depots with fuel, ammunition, food and other consumable supplies. Fuel for ships, planes and vehicles was in much demand. The build up of Espiritu Santo was both a defense strategy and then a staging point for the offense against the Japanese. The base supported action in the Solomon Islands and Papua New Guinea. The base was very active in the Solomon Islands campaign and New Guinea campaign. There were always fears that New Hebrides and Espiritu Santo would be invaded. To build all the bases and airfield tens of thousands of tonnes of equipment was shipped to the base. By the end of the war 9 million tonnes of equipment had been shipped there and over 500,000 servicemen and women had spent some time at New Hebrides and Espiritu Santo.

Airfields
US Navy seabees built four airfields near the naval base, three to support United States Army Air Forces bombers, one to support fighter aircraft. The Royal New Zealand Air Force and US Marine Corps also operated at the airfield.
 Palikulo Bay Airfield also called Bomber Field #1
 Bomber Field No.2 which became Santo-Pekoa International Airport after the war
 Luganville Airfield also called Bomber Field #3
 Turtle Bay Airfield also called Fighter Field #1 served the Fighter planes, built by the 1st Construction Battalion

The base also supported the US New Caledonia base,  to the southwest and the Fiji training base,  to the east. Crushed coral was used or the runways, ramps and road. Local coconut logs were used in building the base.

Auxiliary floating drydock

Auxiliary floating drydocks were used to repair ships. Three large floating drydocks were stationed at the base. Advance base sectional dock (ABSD) were able to repair the largest of the Navy's ships. 
USS Artisan (ABSD-1) (A-J), built by Everett-Pacific and others, docked in the Segond Channel, off Aese island. This was the largest floating drydock ever built able to lift 90,000 tons out of the water for repairs.
  USS AFD-14 served Espiritu Santo. This was a Small Auxiliary Floating Dry Dock. AFD were built as one piece, open at both ends. AFD were used to repair small craft, PT boats and small submarines.
( (A-J), built by Mare Island Naval Shipyard in Vallejo, California. Assembled at the base and then towed to Admiralty Islands's Seeadler Harbor.)
( (A-G), built by Mare Island Naval Ship Yard (NSY). Assembled at the base and then towed to Admiralty Islands's Seeadler Harbor. Attacked by air on April 27, 1945. Partially sunk 1989 as a reef.)

SS President Coolidge
 sank at Espiritu Santo. Coolidge was built as luxury ocean liner in 1931. In 1941 the US War Department converted the ship to a troopship with a capacity of 5,000. On 26 October 1942 it was sunk by two U.S. Navy mines when it unknowingly entered a mined area. It was run aground to keep from sinking while the crew and 5,340 troops safely disembarked. Two died from the mine explosions: a fireman in the engine room and a captain of the 103rd Field Artillery Regiment who had returned to the ship when he heard men were still trapped in the infirmary. As the ship went down it slipped off the reef and sank in the channel. The President Coolidge is the largest and most accessible wreck dive in the world. The ship has vast array of corals and fish, including barracuda and sharks. The President Coolidge is part of the tentative list of World Heritage Site listing.

Million dollar point

At the end of the war a vast amount of vehicles, supplies and equipment at the bases was deemed not needed and too costly to ship to the U.S. Also it would have hurt home front industries in bringing all the gear home as the was already a vast amount of military surplus. The U.S. attempted to sell much of the gear to the French for 6 cents on the dollar. The French hoped that by buying none of the gear the U.S would abandon the base and get everything for free. But the U.S had the Seabees to build a ramp into the sea near Luganville Airfield. The gear was then dumped into the sea. The base was abandoned in February 1946. Today the site is a tourist attraction called Million Dollar Point.

Post war
In 1948 author, James Michener wrote a sequence of fictional short stories called  Tales of the South Pacific. The stories became the basis for the Rodgers and Hammerstein musical, South Pacific. As many troops stayed at or passed through the base, the island became a tourist spot, including a popular scuba diving spot. The Navy base is now part of the city of Luganville.

South Pacific World War II Museum
There is a plan to build a South Pacific World War II Museum on Espiritu Santo in the town of Luganville. The site will be at Unity Park, Main Street, Luganville, Vanuatu. On 26 October 2017 the South Pacific World War II's Museum Museum Project Development Office opened. A few quonset huts and other remnants can still be found on the island.

Gallery

See also
Roi Mata
Seabees in World War II
Battle of the Eastern Solomons
US Naval Advance Bases

References

External links
Video Espiritu Santo Navy Base Hospital No. 3 #1
Video Espiritu Santo Navy Base Hospital No. 3 #2
Video Espiritu Santo Navy Base Hospital No. 3 #3
Video Espiritu Santo Navy Base Hospital
Video, August 15, 1944 the mighty battleship Idaho arrived at Espiritu Santo
Youtube, BATTLESHIP USS IDAHO REPAIRED AT ESPIRITU SANTO in 1944 in USS Artisan (ABSD-1)1

Military installations established in 1942
Naval Stations of the United States Navy
World War II airfields in the Pacific Ocean Theater
Espiritu Santo
Airfields of the United States Navy
Military installations closed in the 1940s
1942 establishments in the New Hebrides
1946 disestablishments in Oceania
1940s in the New Hebrides
Military installations closed in 1946
Closed installations of the United States Navy